Omar Raymundo Gómez Flores (born 24 June 1952) is a Mexican politician affiliated with the Institutional Revolutionary Party. As of 2014 he served as Senator of the LVIII and LIX Legislatures of the Mexican Congress representing Jalisco.

References

1952 births
Living people
Politicians from Guadalajara, Jalisco
Members of the Senate of the Republic (Mexico)
Institutional Revolutionary Party politicians
21st-century Mexican politicians
University of Guadalajara alumni